Rotting Piñata is the debut studio album by American rock band Sponge, released on August 2, 1994 through Work Group. Hit singles from this album, such as "Plowed" and
"Molly (16 Candles Down the Drain)", helped launch the band's career and the album was certified gold by the RIAA in July 1995.

Release
Rotting Piñata is Sponge's best selling album, having sold more than 500,000 copies. Although released in August 1994, the album did not enter the Billboard 200 until February 1995, following the success of its second single "Plowed". Rotting Piñata peaked at number 58 and remained on the chart for 40 weeks.

Critical reception

Rotting Piñata received mostly positive reviews. However, AllMusic staff writer Stephen Thomas Erlewine said that the album was derivative of Pearl Jam or Stone Temple Pilots, with a few good songs but otherwise featuring "half-finished ideas". Trouser Press was more positive about the album, noting "Plowed" and "Molly" as having "catchy hooks and hummable choruses" while also being "colored by murky sonic structures that layer a bit of lead around their listener-friendly cores." They also wrote "Elsewhere on Rotting Piñata, Sponge shows an affinity for density and drone— particularly in 'Pennywheels' and the metallic chug of 'Neenah Menasha'— while 'Giants' explores tense instrumental dynamics."

Track listing
All songs written by Sponge (Vinnie Dombroski, Joey Mazzola, Mike Cross, Tim Cross, Jimmy Paluzzi) and produced by Tim Patalan and Sponge.

A special edition included a bonus CD featuring Sponge live at Rock am Ring Nürburgring on June 2, 1995.

All songs written by Sponge except where noted.

Personnel

Sponge
 Vinnie Dombroski - vocals
 Mike Cross - guitar, backing vocals
 Tim Cross - bass
 Joey Mazzola - guitar, backing vocals
 Jimmy Paluzzi - drums, backing vocals

Additional personnel
 Andy Patalan - production assistant
 Tim Palmer - mixing
 Mark O'Donoughue & Brandon Harris - mixing assistants
 Tim Patalan - mixing on "Rotting Piñata", "Neenah Menasha", "Miles" and "Molly"
 Stuart Griffen - Talent agent
 Pablo Mathiason - A&R
 Howie Weinberg - mastering
 David Coleman - art direction
 Michael Halsband - photography

Charts

Weekly charts

Year-end charts

Singles

Certifications

Trivia
 The title of the album (and song of the same name) came from a conversation the band had regarding controversial punk rock singer GG Allin. Allin promised for several years that he would die by suicide on stage during one of his concerts, but instead died from an accidental drug overdose. The band wondered if Allin would want a posthumous tour instead, where his corpse would be present at the shows and fans would be able to hit or take a whack at it. The band's soundman Chris remarked that if that happened, the corpse would be like a rotting piñata.
 Neenah and Menasha are two cities in Wisconsin.
 Track number five, "Miles", includes the last two lines of Robert Frost's poem "Stopping by Woods on a Snowy Evening" ("And miles to go before I sleep, And miles to go before I sleep.").
 Lead vocalist Vinnie Dombroski came up with the lyrics for "Plowed" while shoveling snow in his hometown of Detroit. 
 The vocals for "Molly" were re-recorded for the single release, retitled "Molly (16 Candles Down the Drain)". The song was partly inspired by a story the band had heard about a 16-year-old girl who fell in love with one of her teachers and attempted suicide after he rejected her advances.

See also
1994 in music

References

1994 debut albums
Sponge (band) albums